The 2015–16 Belgian Basketball Cup season was the 62nd edition of the national cup competition for men's basketball in Belgium. Telenet Oostende won its 17th Cup title. Khalid Boukichou of Oostende was named the Most Valuable Player of the tournament.

Bracket

Final
The attendance of 7,000 was a new all-time record for highest attendance in a Belgian Cup Final.

References

Belgian Basketball Cup
Cup